André Benoit (born 16 October 1962) is a Canadian luger. He competed at the 1988 Winter Olympics and the 1992 Winter Olympics.

References

External links
 

1962 births
Living people
Canadian male lugers
Olympic lugers of Canada
Lugers at the 1988 Winter Olympics
Lugers at the 1992 Winter Olympics
People from Sainte-Foy, Quebec City
Sportspeople from Quebec City